SK DFO Pardubice was a Czech women's football team from Pardubice, lastly played in the 2017–18 Czech Second Division. The club's best finish is 7th place in the First Division, which it achieved in the 2008–09 season. Team merged with FK Pardubice in 2018.

The club celebrated 20 years of existence in 2012.

Previous seasons
The club played in the Second Division for its first eight seasons until finishing second in the 2000–01 season and being promoted to the First Division. After three seasons, the team was relegated, but after winning the 2005–06 Second Division, the team returned to the top flight.

 1992–2001 Czech Second Division
 2001–2004 Czech First Division
 2004–2006 Czech Second Division
 2006–2016 Czech First Division
 2016–2018 Czech Second Division

Historical names
 1992 — DFO Zdelov
 1999 — DFO Ředice
 2007 — SK DFO Pardubice
 2018 — merged with FK Pardubice

Honours
Czech Second Division
 Champions 2005–06, 2018-19, 
 Runners-up 2000–01
Czech Women's Cup
 Runners-up 2011–12

Last squad

Staff 

Sports secretary 	
  Veronika Sehnoutková

Manager 	
  Josef Karabinoš

Assistant 	
  Martin Macháček 

Masseur
 Roman Divoký

References

External links 
Facebook official 

Women's football clubs in the Czech Republic
Defunct football clubs in the Czech Republic
Association football clubs established in 1992
Sport in Pardubice
Association football clubs disestablished in 2018
1992 establishments in Czechoslovakia